Jaime Eduardo Alemán Healy (born 14 November 1953) is a Panamanian lawyer, businessman and diplomat. He served as Ambassador of Panama to the United States of America from August 11, 2009 to January 2, 2011 after being appointed to that position by the 52nd President of the Republic of Panama, Ricardo Martinelli Berrocal.

Education
Alemán was born in 1953 in Panama City, Panama. He spent a significant part of his childhood living in Washington, DC while his father, Roberto Alemán Zubieta, was serving as one of the leading negotiators for the Robles-Johnson Treaties and later on as Ambassador of Panama to the United States (1968–69). His brother is José Miguel Alemán, a Panamanian politician who ran for president in 2004. He holds a Juris Doctor degree from Duke University School of Law ('78) and a B.A. in Economics from the University of Notre Dame. Ambassador Alemán is an honorary member of Duke’s School of Law Board of Visitors, and in 2003 he was honored by the school with the International Alumni Achievement Award.

Career

Business 
Alemán is currently the managing partner at Alemán, Cordero, Galindo & Lee, a Panamanian law firm, which he founded in 1985. The firm was one of the largest sources of leaked documents in the Pandora Papers scandal.

For over two decades, Alemán has been a member of the Board of Directors of various entities, including HSBC Bank Panama, Banistmo, Leasing Banistmo, Panamá Power Holdings, Fideicomiso Ena Norte, PKB Bank (Panama) and the Tag Bank.

He has also been a member of the International Lawyers Association of Panama and the Panama chapter of the Young Presidents' Organization (YPO). Alemán has also been the Chairman of the Board of Directors of the International Lawyers Association of Panama and the Special Olympics.

In his career as a lawyer, he is a member of the District of Columbia Bar Association, the Panama Bar Association, the American Bar Association, the Society of Trust and Estate Practitioners (STEP) and the International Bar Association.

Political 
Ambassador Alemán began his public career in 1978 as a legal advisor to the Inter-American Development Bank in Washington D.C. From 1984 to 1985, he served as legal counselor to President Nicolás Ardito Barletta and, in 1988, as Minister of Government and Justice under President Eric Arturo Delvalle. In 1999, Ambassador Alemán was appointed Member of the Council of Foreign Affairs by President Mireya Moscoso. In August 2009, he was appointed Panama´s Ambassador to the United States and served until 2 January 2011.

He was reappointed to the Council of Foreign Affairs by President Laurentino Cortizo in 2020.

Publications 
Ambassador Alemán published his autobiography titled “La Honestidad No Tiene Precio” in August 2014.

Personal accomplishments 
Alemán has traveled to all 193 UN member countries, becoming the first Hispanic American on record to do so. He has also visited Antarctica and is planning a trip to the North Pole and another one to Outer Space.

Family life 
He is married to María del Pilar Arosemena de Alemán and has three children: Jaime Eduardo, Ana Sofía and Juan Manuel, as well as five grandchildren.

References

External links
 Alemán, Cordero, Galindo & Lee

Living people
People from Panama City
Panamanian businesspeople
Ambassadors of Panama to the United States
Duke University School of Law alumni
Notre Dame College of Arts and Letters alumni
1953 births